Theretra tomasi is a moth of the  family Sphingidae. It is known from Senegal.

References

Theretra
Moths described in 2008
Endemic fauna of Senegal
Moths of Africa